Arsenal Women Football Club Academy is the youth academy of Arsenal Women Football Club. The academy operates for girls from 9 to 21 years old.

History
The academy has won three FA Girls Youth Cups in addition to other trophies lifted altogether.

Notable players
This is a list of former Arsenal W.F.C. Academy players who have gone on to represent their country at full international level. Players who are still at Arsenal, or play at another club on loan from Arsenal, are highlighted in bold.

Updated 16 August 2022

  Lily Agg
  Anita Asante
  Jade Bailey
  Paige Bailey-Gayle
  Vaila Barsley
  Lauren Bruton
  Laura Coombs
  Gemma Davison
  Anna Filbey
  Gilly Flaherty
  Silvana Flores
  Angharad James
  Lauren James
  Cherelle Khassal 
  Chloe Kelly
  Hayley Ladd
  Taryn Rockall
  Vyan Sampson
  Lianne Sanderson
  Alex Scott
  Renée Slegers
  Drew Spence
  Rebecca Spencer
  Casey Stoney
  Leah Williamson
  Sarah Wiltshire
  Ellen White
  Lotte Wubben-Moy

Honours
FA Girls Youth Cup: 2015 & 2016
FA Girls League Cup: 2016

References

Arsenal W.F.C.